Ovčáry  is a municipality and village in Kolín District in the Central Bohemian Region of the Czech Republic. It has about 800 inhabitants.

Geography
It lies in the Central Elbe Table lowland within the Polabí region. The Hluboký and Sendražický brooks flow through the municipality.

History
The first written mention of Ovčáry is from 1273, when it was owned by the Strahov Monastery. From 1436 to 1850, the village was part of the Kolín estate.

Economy
In Ovčáry there is the larger part of Kolín–Ovčáry Industrial Zone, known mostly for the factory of the automobile manufacturing company TPCA.

Sights
The main landmark is the Church of Saint James the Great. It was built in the neo-Gothic style in 1906–1908 and replaced an old Gothic church.

References

External links

Villages in Kolín District